David Ross Wightman (10 August 1929 – 11 January 2012) was a New Zealand rugby union player. He was a member of the New Zealand national side, the All Blacks, on their 1951 tour of Australia, playing in four games although he did not appear in any of the three test matches.

References

1929 births
2012 deaths
Rugby union players from Hamilton, New Zealand
University of Otago alumni
New Zealand rugby union players
New Zealand international rugby union players
Otago rugby union players
Auckland rugby union players
Waikato rugby union players
Rugby union centres
Rugby union wings
People educated at Morrinsville College